The 1995 Korean League was the 13th season of K League since its establishment in 1983.

Regular season

First stage

Second stage

Championship playoffs

Awards

Main awards

Source:

Best XI

Source:

See also
1995 K League Championship
1995 Korean League Cup

References

External links
 RSSSF

K League seasons
1
South Korea
South Korea